The Icon Brickell complex is an urban development center in Miami, Florida, United States. It is located on the south side of the Miami River in Downtown's northern Brickell Financial District. The complex consists of three skyscrapers and the Icon Brickell Plaza, connecting the towers at their base. The first two towers, the Icon Brickell North Tower and Icon Brickell South Tower, are twin buildings. The complex is on the east side of Brickell Avenue between Southeast 5th and 6th Streets. The architectural firm Arquitectonica worked on the project, while the design was done by Philippe Starck and John Hitchcox's design company.

North and south twin towers
The Icon Brickell South Tower is adjacent to its twin, the Icon Brickell North Tower. They are the same height and share the same amount of floors. The North Tower is the same height as the South Tower, but is shaped differently.

W Miami
W Miami (formerly Viceroy Miami) is the third building in the Icon Brickell Complex. Like the North Tower and South Tower, W Miami was designed by Arquitectonica. Unlike the twin towers it shares the site with, W Miami is shorter and instead of simply condominiums, it also includes a hotel. W Miami is managed by Starwood Hotels and Resorts Worldwide, Inc.  The association of condominium owners is named the Icon Brickell Condo Number Three Association.

W Miami is home to the "Whisper Lounge", a 50th floor rooftop lounge that boasts a swimming pool and panoramic view of downtown Miami, Key Biscayne and South Miami Beach.

Gallery

See also
List of tallest buildings in Miami

References

 Icon Brickell Complex

External links 
 Official website
 W Miami Official Website

Residential buildings completed in 2008
Residential skyscrapers in Miami
Hotels in Miami
Twin towers
2008 establishments in Florida
Arquitectonica buildings